Jackson Mullane (born 30 January 1987) is an Australian composer, film director, screenwriter and actor. He was made popular by his portrayal of Outlaw in the television series Australian Gladiators. Mullane was also a Representative rugby union player.

In 2006 Jackson toured to Dubai with the under 19s Australian Team winning the world championships. 
In 2006 he also made his representative rugby debut for the NSW Waratahs. In 2007 he played for the Perth Spirit and Sydney Fleet in the Australian Rugby Championship.

He was a 1st grade rugby player for the Southern Districts Rugby Club.

TV career
From 2008 he appeared as 'Outlaw' in Gladiators (Australian TV series).

External links
 

1987 births
Living people
Australian rugby union players
Australian male actors
People educated at St Joseph's College, Hunters Hill
Rugby union wings